Sybra basialbofasciata is a species of beetle in the family Cerambycidae. It was described by Hayashi in 1972.

References

basialbofasciata
Beetles described in 1972